Dixeia spilleri the Spiller's (sulphur) yellow or Spiller's canary white, is a butterfly in the family Pieridae. It is native to southern and eastern Africa.

The wingspan is 33–40 mm in males and 35–42 mm in females. Its flight period is year-round.

Larvae feed on Capparis species.

References

Seitz, A. Die Gross-Schmetterlinge der Erde 13: Die Afrikanischen Tagfalter. Plate XIII 14

Butterflies described in 1884
Pierini
Butterflies of Africa